Mary Behrend, whose husband Ernst Behrend co-founded the Hammermill Paper Company in 1898, donated the land that later became Penn State Erie, The Behrend College.

References

Pennsylvania State University people
Penn State Erie, The Behrend College
Philanthropists from Pennsylvania